Danika "Nika" McGuigan (4 January 1986 – 23 July 2019) was an actress born in Northern Ireland and raised in England. She was known for her role as Danielle Mullane in Can't Cope, Won't Cope (2016–2018). She was posthumously awarded at the 2021 IFTA Awards for her final role in Cathy Brady's film Wildfire.

Her previous films included The Secret Scripture (2016) alongside Rooney Mara and Jack Reynor.

Early life and education
McGuigan was born in Newry, Northern Ireland in 1986, the second of four children and only daughter of Barry McGuigan, a former world champion boxer and his wife Sandra. Her brothers were Blain, Jack, and Shane.

McGuigan spent her early childhood in Clones, County Monaghan before the family settled in rural Kent, England near Whitstable. She attended St Edmund's School Canterbury and then boarded at Benenden School. She trained in Dublin, graduating from the Gaiety School of Acting in 2006, and The Factory (now Bow Street) in 2013 before moving to London.

Death
McGuigan was first diagnosed with acute lymphoblastic leukemia at age 11 in 1997, but recovered from the illness after two years. She was pulled out of school at the time for her treatment at St Bartholomew's Hospital, London. However, she died on 23 July 2019, aged 33, after a short battle with colon cancer as an adult.

Filmography

Film

Television

Awards and nominations

References

External links

1986 births
2019 deaths
21st-century actresses from Northern Ireland
Actresses from Kent
Alumni of the Bow Street Academy
Deaths from cancer in the Republic of Ireland
Deaths from colorectal cancer
Film actresses from Northern Ireland
People from Clones, County Monaghan
People from Newry
People educated at Benenden School
People educated at St Edmund's School Canterbury
Actors with dyslexia
Television actresses from Northern Ireland